Longnor is a civil parish in the district of Staffordshire Moorlands, Staffordshire, England. It contains 33 listed buildings that are recorded in the National Heritage List for England.  Of these, one is at Grade II*, the middle of the three grades, and the others are at Grade II, the lowest grade.  The parish contains the village of Longnor and the surrounding area.  Most of the listed buildings are houses and cottages in the village.  The other listed buildings include a church and items in the churchyard, farmhouses and farm buildings, a wayside cross, a milestone, a milepost, public houses, a bridge, a chapel, and a market hall.


Key

Buildings

See also

Listed buildings in Hartington Middle Quarter
Listed buildings in Sheen, Staffordshire
Listed buildings in Heathylee
Listed buildings in Hollinsclough

References

Citations

Sources

Lists of listed buildings in Staffordshire